In the mathematical field of graph theory, a self-complementary graph is a graph which is isomorphic to its complement. The simplest non-trivial self-complementary graphs are the  path graph and the  cycle graph. There is no known characterization of self-complementary graphs.

Examples
Every Paley graph is self-complementary. For example, the 3 × 3 rook's graph (the Paley graph of order nine) is self-complementary, by a symmetry that keeps the center vertex in place but exchanges the roles of the four side midpoints and four corners of the grid. All strongly regular self-complementary graphs with fewer than 37 vertices are Paley graphs; however, there are strongly regular graphs on 37, 41, and 49 vertices that are not Paley graphs.

The Rado graph is an infinite self-complementary graph.

Properties
An  self-complementary graph has exactly half number of edges of the complete graph, i.e.,  edges, and (if there is more than one vertex) it must have diameter either 2 or 3. Since  must be divisible by 4,  must be congruent to 0 or 1 mod 4; for instance, a  graph cannot be self-complementary.

Computational complexity
The problems of checking whether two self-complementary graphs are isomorphic and of checking whether a given graph is self-complementary are polynomial-time equivalent to the general graph isomorphism problem.

References

External links

Graph families